Azygophleps pallens is a moth in the family Cossidae. It is found in Sierra Leone, Uganda, Nigeria, Cameroon, Kenya and Sudan.

References

Moths described in 1854
Azygophleps